The 2020 Saint Louis FC season was the club's sixth and final season of existence, and their sixth consecutive season in the USL Championship, the second tier of American soccer. Saint Louis additionally competed in the U.S. Open Cup. This article covers the period from November 18, 2019, the day after the 2019 USL-C Playoff Final, to the conclusion of the 2020 USL-C Playoff Final, scheduled for November 12–16, 2020.

Roster

Competitive

USL Championship

Standings — Group E

Match results

USL Cup Playoffs

U.S. Open Cup 

As a USL Championship club, St. Louis FC will enter the competition in the Second Round, to be played April 7–9.

References

Saint Louis FC
2020
Saint Louis
Saint Louis FC